Lauren Blazing (born December 22, 1992) is an American field hockey player for the American national team.

She participated at the 2018 Women's Hockey World Cup. She graduated from Yale Law School, where she served as a teaching assistant for Professor Harold Koh.

References

1992 births
Living people
American female field hockey players
Female field hockey goalkeepers
Sportspeople from Durham, North Carolina
Duke Blue Devils field hockey players